The 2013–14 Holy Cross Crusaders men's basketball team represented the College of the Holy Cross during the 2013–14 NCAA Division I men's basketball season. The Crusaders, led by fourth year head coach Milan Brown, played their home games at the Hart Center and were members of the Patriot League. They finished the season 20–14, 12–6 in Patriot League play to finish in third place. They advanced to the semifinals of the Patriot League tournament where they lost to American. They were invited to the CollegeInsdiers.com Tournament where they defeated Brown in the first round before losing to Yale in the second round.

Roster

Schedule

|-
!colspan=9 style="background:#660066; color:#FFFFFF;"|  Exhibition

|-
!colspan=9 style="background:#660066; color:#FFFFFF;"|  Regular season

|-
!colspan=9 style="background:#660066; color:#FFFFFF;"| Patriot League tournament

|-
!colspan=9 style="background:#660066; color:#FFFFFF;"| CIT

References

Holy Cross Crusaders men's basketball seasons
Holy Cross
Holy Cross
Holy Cross Crusaders men's basketball
Holy Cross Crusaders men's basketball